Phenibut, sold under the brand names Anvifen, Fenibut, and Noofen among others, is a central nervous system depressant with anxiolytic effects, and is used to treat anxiety, insomnia, and for a variety of other indications. It is usually taken by mouth as a tablet, but may be given intravenously.

Side effects of phenibut include sedation, sleepiness, nausea, irritability, agitation, dizziness, and headache, among others. Overdose of phenibut can produce marked central nervous system depression including unconsciousness. The medication is structurally related to the neurotransmitter γ-aminobutyric acid (GABA), and hence is a GABA analogue. Phenibut is thought to act as a GABAB receptor agonist, similarly to baclofen and γ-hydroxybutyrate (GHB). However, at low concentrations, phenibut mildly increases the concentration of dopamine in the brain, providing stimulatory effects in addition to the anxiolysis.

Phenibut was developed in the Soviet Union and was introduced for medical use in the 1960s. Today, it is marketed for medical use in Russia, Ukraine, Belarus, Kazakhstan, and Latvia. The medication is not approved for clinical use in the United States and most of Europe, but it is also sold on the Internet as a supplement and purported nootropic. Phenibut has been used recreationally and can produce euphoria as well as addiction, dependence, and withdrawal. It is a controlled substance in Australia, and it has been suggested that its legal status should be reconsidered in Europe as well.

Medical uses
Phenibut is used in Russia, Ukraine, Belarus and Latvia as a pharmaceutical drug to treat anxiety and to improve sleep (e.g., in the treatment of insomnia). It is also used for various other indications, including the treatment of asthenia, depression, alcoholism, alcohol withdrawal syndrome, post-traumatic stress disorder, stuttering, tics, vestibular disorders, Ménière's disease, dizziness, for the prevention of motion sickness, and for the prevention of anxiety before or after surgical procedures or painful diagnostic tests.

Available forms
Phenibut is available as a medication in the form of 250 mg or 500 mg tablets for oral administration and as a solution at a concentration of 10 mg/mL for infusion. In the US, dietary supplements labeled as containing phenibut have been found to contain zero to greater than 1,100 mg of phenibut per serving.

Contraindications
Contraindications of phenibut include:

 Intolerance to phenibut
 Pregnancy and breastfeeding
 Children who are younger than two years of age
 Liver insufficiency or failure
 Ulcerative lesions of the gastrointestinal tract

Phenibut should not be combined with alcohol.

Side effects
Phenibut is generally well-tolerated. Possible side effects may include sedation, somnolence, nausea, irritability, agitation, anxiety, dizziness, headache, and allergic reactions such as skin rash and itching. At high doses, motor incoordination, loss of balance, and hangovers may occur. Due to its central nervous system depressant effects, people taking phenibut should refrain from potentially dangerous activities such as operating heavy machinery. With prolonged use of phenibut, particularly at high doses, the liver and blood should be monitored, due to risk of fatty liver disease and eosinophilia.

Overdose
In overdose, phenibut can cause severe drowsiness, nausea, vomiting, eosinophilia, lowered blood pressure, renal impairment, and, above 7 grams, fatty liver degeneration. There are no specific antidotes for phenibut overdose. Lethargy, somnolence, agitation, delirium, tonic–clonic seizures, reduced consciousness or unconsciousness, and unresponsiveness have been reported in recreational users who have overdosed. Management of phenibut overdose includes activated charcoal, gastric lavage, induction of vomiting, and symptom-based treatment. There have been three associated deaths which found Phenibut in the users system but only one of these cases single handedly included Phenibut.

Dependency and withdrawal 
Tolerance to phenibut easily develops with repeated use leading to dependency. Withdrawal symptoms may occur upon discontinuation, and, in recreational users taking high doses, have been reported to include severe rebound anxiety, insomnia, anger, irritability, agitation, visual and auditory hallucinations, and acute psychosis. Baclofen has successfully been used for treatment of phenibut dependence.

Interactions 

Phenibut may mutually potentiate and extend the duration of the effects of other central nervous system depressants including anxiolytics, antipsychotics, sedatives, opioids, anticonvulsants, and alcohol.

Pharmacology

Pharmacodynamics

Phenibut acts as a full agonist of the GABAB receptor, similarly to baclofen. It has between 30- to 68-fold lower affinity for the GABAB receptor than baclofen, and, in accordance, is used at far higher doses in comparison. (R)-Phenibut has more than 100-fold higher affinity for the GABAB receptor than does (S)-phenibut; hence, (R)-phenibut is the active enantiomer at the GABAB receptor.

Phenibut also binds to and blocks α2δ subunit-containing VDCCs, similarly to gabapentin and pregabalin, and hence is a gabapentinoid. Both (R)-phenibut and (S)-phenibut display this action with similar affinity (Ki = 23 and 39 μM, respectively).

Pharmacokinetics
Little information thus far has been published on the clinical pharmacokinetics of phenibut. The drug is reported to be well-absorbed. It distributes widely throughout the body and across the blood–brain barrier. Approximately 0.1% of an administered dose of phenibut reportedly penetrates into the brain, with this said to occur to a much greater extent in young people and the elderly. Following a single 250 mg dose in healthy volunteers, its elimination half-life was approximately 5.3 hours and the drug was largely (63%) excreted in the urine unchanged.

Some limited information has been described on the pharmacokinetics of phenibut in recreational users taking much higher doses (e.g., 1–3 grams) than typical clinical doses. In these individuals, the onset of action of phenibut has been reported to be 2 to 4 hours orally and 20 to 30 minutes rectally, the peak effects are described as occurring 4 to 6 hours following oral ingestion, and the total duration for the oral route has been reported to be 15 to 24 hours (or about 3 to 5 terminal half-lives).

Chemistry
Phenibut is a synthetic aromatic amino acid. It is a chiral molecule and thus has two potential configurations, as (R)- and (S)-enantiomers.

Structure and analogues

Phenibut is a derivative of the inhibitory neurotransmitter GABA. Hence, it is a GABA analogue. Phenibut is specifically the analogue of GABA with a phenyl ring substituted in at the β-position. As such, its chemical name is β-phenyl-γ-aminobutyric acid, which can be abbreviated as β-phenyl-GABA. The presence of the phenyl ring allows phenibut to cross the blood–brain barrier significantly, unlike the case of GABA. Phenibut also contains the trace amine β-phenethylamine in its structure.

Phenibut is closely related to a variety of other GABA analogues including baclofen (β-(4-chlorophenyl)-GABA), 4-fluorophenibut (β-(4-fluorophenyl)-GABA), tolibut (β-(4-methylphenyl)-GABA), pregabalin ((S)-β-isobutyl-GABA), gabapentin (1-(aminomethyl)cyclohexane acetic acid), and GABOB (β-hydroxy-GABA). It has almost the same chemical structure as baclofen, differing from it only in having a hydrogen atom instead of a chlorine atom at the para position of the phenyl ring. Phenibut is also close in structure to pregabalin, which has an isobutyl group at the β position instead of phenibut's phenyl ring.

A glutamate-derivative analogue of phenibut is glufimet (dimethyl 3-phenylglutamate hydrochloride).

Synthesis
A chemical synthesis of phenibut has been published.

History
Phenibut was synthesized at the A. I. Herzen Leningrad Pedagogical Institute (USSR) by Professor Vsevolod Perekalin's team and tested at the Institute of Experimental Medicine, USSR Academy of Medical Sciences. It was introduced into clinical use in Russia in the 1960s.

Society and culture

Other names
Alternate spellings include fenibut and phenybut. It is also sometimes referred to as aminophenylbutyric acid. The word phenibut is a contraction of the chemical name of the drug, β-phenyl-γ-aminobutyric acid. In early publications, phenibut was referred to as fenigam and phenigama.

Brand names
Phenibut is marketed in Russia, Ukraine, Belarus and Latvia under the brand names Anvifen, Fenibut, Bifren and Noofen (Russian: Анвифен, Фенибут, Бифрен and Ноофен, respectively).

Availability
Phenibut is approved in Russia, Ukraine, Belarus and Latvia for medical use. It is not approved or available as a medication in other countries in the European Union, the United States, or Australia. In countries where phenibut is not a licensed pharmaceutical drug, it is sold online without a prescription as a "nutritional supplement". It is often used as a form of self-medication for social anxiety.

Recreational use
Phenibut is used recreationally due to its ability to produce euphoria, anxiolysis, and increased sociability, as well as remaining undetected in routine urinalysis. Because of its delayed onset of effects, first-time users often mistakenly take an additional dose of phenibut in the belief that the initial dose did not work. Recreational users usually take the drug orally; there are a few case reports of rectal administration and one report of insufflation, which was described as "very painful" and causing swollen nostrils.

Legal status
As of 2021, phenibut is a controlled substance in Australia, France, Hungary, Italy, and Lithuania. In 2015, it was suggested that the legal status of phenibut in Europe should be reconsidered due to its recreational potential. In February 2018, the Australian Therapeutic Goods Administration declared it a prohibited (schedule 9) substance, citing health concerns due to withdrawal and overdose.

As of 14 November 2018, Hungary added phenibut and 10 other items to its New Psychoactive Substances ban list.

As of 26 August 2020, Italy added phenibut to its New Psychoactive Substances ban list.

As of 18 September 2020, France added phenibut to the controlled psychoactive substances list, prohibiting production, sale, storage and use.

In the United States, Phenibut is not a Controlled Substance. However, Dietary supplements that contain Phenibut are unlawful to introduce into interstate commerce, because Phenibut is considered a "New Drug" and any food, supplement, cosmetic, or drug that contains Phenibut is therefore adulterated. Alabama scheduled Phenibut and Tianeptine in 2021 first by action of the Alabama Department of Public Health and then followed by the state legislature.

References

Analgesics
Anticonvulsants
Anxiolytics
Bodybuilding supplements
Calcium channel blockers
Drug culture
Drugs in the Soviet Union
Euphoriants
GABA analogues
GABAA receptor agonists
GABAB receptor agonists
Hypnotics
Muscle relaxants
Nootropics
Phenethylamines
Russian drugs
Stimulants